The 1931 Census or census of 1931 may refer to:

Canada 1931 Census
1931 Cuba census
1931 census of India
1931 census of Palestine 
Polish census of 1931
United Kingdom census, 1931
Yugoslav census of 1931
1931 population census in Bosnia and Herzegovina